John Simeon Colebrook Elkington (1871–1955) a leading advocate of public health in Australia. He pioneered programs for checking the health of schoolchildren and the federal quarantine service. He also researched tropical medicine, an important issue in northern Australia.

Early life
John Simeon Colebrook Elkington was born on 29 September 1871 at Castlemaine, Victoria, son of John Simeon Elkington and his wife Helen Mary (née Guilfoyle).

From 1890 he studied medicine at the University of Melbourne but failed in his examinations. He later qualified as a licentiate at Edinburgh and Glasgow in 1896.

Career
In 1903, Dr Elkington was asked to come to Launceston, Tasmania to advise on how to deal with an outbreak of smallpox and how to prevent it spreading to other areas. Elkington recommended mass vaccination.

In 1904, Dr Elkington made a study of school hygiene factors for the Tasmanian Government, resulting in new design rules for ventilation, lighting and "sanitary accommodation" in schools. On his recommendation, a program of regular health inspections of school pupils was established to ensure normal physical development was occurring and to organise medical intervention when required; teachers were also trained to detect and report possible health defects.

Following the formation of the Commonwealth of Australia in 1901, quarantine became a federal responsibility under the Commonwealth Quarantine Act 1908. From 1908-1911, the Queensland Commissioner of Public Health (a position created under Queensland's Health Act of 1900) performed the duties of quarantine officer for the Commonwealth. In 1910 Dr Elkington was appointed to this position, and in the following three years established Queensland's public health infrastructure, and oversaw the administration and implementation of State and Commonwealth quarantine practices.

In January 1912, the administration of quarantine facilities and practices in Queensland was transferred wholly to the Federal Quarantine Bureau. In December 1913, Elkington resigned his State position and joined the Commonwealth Health Service in Brisbane, overseeing the establishment of the heritage-listed Lytton Quarantine Station at the mouth of the Brisbane River. Elkington became the authority on quarantine practice in post-Federation Australia. In 1922 Elkington wrote a text on quarantine procedures for the Commonwealth, which not only governed quarantine practice in Australia but was adopted as the model in at least three other countries.

In 1917, Dr. Elkington, then Director of the Division of Tropical Hygiene, Commonwealth Department of Health, was concerned about health and hygiene of the growing population of Croydon, Queensland and contemplated conducting a statistical and social survey of the town, which did not eventuate. However, his interest in sociological surveys of gathering social and economic details on a population later developed into the 1924 Sociological Survey of White Women conducted from the Institute of Tropical Medicine in Townsville.

In the 1920s with other medical colleagues, he was instrumental in establishing a number of Commonwealth health laboratories to protect Australia against epidemic diseases. Laboratories were established in Bendigo, Toowoomba, Townsville within Australia and also Rabaul in Papua New Guinea.

Later life
Elkington died on 8 March 1955 at Mooloolaba, Queensland.

References

Attribution

External links
 

1871 births
1955 deaths
People from Castlemaine, Victoria
University of Melbourne alumni
Australian public health doctors
Articles incorporating text from the Queensland Heritage Register